The following list includes notable people who were born or have lived in Kaposvár, Somogy County, Hungary.

Arts
 László Babarczy (born 1941), Hungarian theater director
 Aurél Bernáth (1895–1982), Hungarian painter, art theorist
 István Bors (1938 - 2003), Hungarian sculptor
 Béla Faragó (born 1961), Hungarian composer
 Sándor Galimberti (1883 - 1915), Hungarian painter
 János Gyenes (1912 - 1995), Hungarian photographer
 Zsolt Homonnay (born 1971), Hungarian actor
 Ilona Ivancsics (born 1960), Hungarian actress
 Ferenc Martyn (1899 – 1986), Hungarian artist, sculptor, graphic designer
 Zoltán Őszi (born 1967), Hungarian graphic designer, illustrator
 Judit Pogány (born 1944), Hungarian actress
 József Rippl-Rónai (1861 - 1927), Hungarian painter
 Magdolna Szőnyi (1915 - 1992), Hungarian arts teacher, artist
 Klári Varga (born 1970), Hungarian actress
 Zsuzsanna Varga (born 1970), Hungarian actress
 János Vaszary (1817 - 1939), Hungarian painter, graphic artist

Church
 Béla Balás (born 1941), Hungarian Bishop of Kaposvár

Literature
 Róbert Cey-Bert (born 1938), Hungarian writer, psychosociologist, food historian and a university professor
 Éva Czipri (1943 – 1974), Hungarian chemist, poet
 Kriszta D. Tóth (born 1975), Hungarian author, journalist, ambassador of UNICEF
 Éva Fésűs (born 1926), Hungarian author
 Árpád Papp (1937 – 2010), Hungarian poet, literature historian, translator, teacher
 Gábor Rozsos (born 1965), Hungarian poet
 István Kemsei (born 1944), Hungarian poet, essayist, teacher, librarian
 Tamás Szabó Kimmel (born 1984), Hungarian actor
 Manó Kónyi (1842 - ?), Hungarian stenographer, publicist
 Manó Marton (1874 - 1928), Hungarian journalist, editor, poet
 Ludwig Scharf (1864 - 1939), German lyricist, translator
 Fruzina Szalay (1864 – 1926), Hungarian poet, translator
Atala Kisfaludy (1836 – 1911) Hungary poet, writer.
 Gyula Takáts (1911 - 2008), Hungarian poet, author, translator, teacher

Military
 Béla Király (1912 – 2009), Hungarian army officer
 László Merész (1915 - 1997), Hungarian soldier

Politics
 István Gyenesei (born 1948), Hungarian politician
 Imre Nagy (1896 – 1958), Hungarian politician
 Alajos Záborszky (1805 – 1862), Hungarian politician, lawyer

Science
 Sándor Abday (1800 – 1882), Hungarian actor, theater director
 György Buzsáki (born 1949), Hungarian neuroscientist
 Péter Frankl (born 1953), Hungarian mathematician, street performer, columnist, educator
 Péter Hanák (1921 - 1997), Hungarian historian, cultural historian
 János Haraszti (1924 – 2007), Hungarian veterinarian, university teacher, researcher
 Moritz Kaposi (1837 – 1902), Hungarian physician, dermatologist, discoverer of the skin tumor called Kaposi's sarcoma
 Ernő Lendvai (1925 – 1993), Hungarian mathematician, music theorists
 György Németh (born 1956), Hungarian historian, teacher
 Lajos Papp (born 1948), Hungarian heart surgeon, professor
 Virag Dora (born 1993), Hungarian medical doctor,

Sports

Football
 Szabolcs Balajcza (born 1979), Hungarian football player
 Benjamin Balázs (born 1990), Hungarian football player
 István Bank (born 1984), Hungarian football player
 Lukács Bőle (born 1990), Hungarian football player
 Győző Burcsa (born 1954), Hungarian football player
 Zoltán Czibor (1929 - 1997), Hungarian football player
 Zoltán Farkas (born 1989), Hungarian football player
 Zoltán Finta (born 1979), Hungarian football player
 László Horváth (born 1988), Hungarian football player
 Zoltán Jovánczai (born 1984), Hungarian football player
 Béla Koplárovics (born 1981), Hungarian football player
 Viktor Petrók (born 1981), Hungarian football player
 Gábor Reszli (born 1988), Hungarian football player
 Róbert Waltner (born 1977), Hungarian football player

Other sports
 Antal Bolvári (born 1932), Hungarian water polo player
 Ferenc Csik (1913 - 1945), Hungarian swimmer
 Leila Gyenesei (born 1986), Hungarian modern pentathlete, cross-country skier
 Árpád Lengyel (1915 – 1993), Hungarian swimmer
 Attila May (born 1942), Hungarian fencer
 Anna Pfeffer (born 1945), Hungarian sprint canoeist
 László Sótonyi (born 1970), Hungarian handball player, coach

Technology
 Péter Horn (born 1942), Hungarian agricultural engineer, professor 
 György Szigetvári (1926 – 2018), Hungarian architect

Other
 Csilla Molnár (1969 – 1986), Hungarian beauty queen

References

People from Kaposvár
People from Somogy County
Kaposvár